Xavier Koenig (7 August 1984 – 30 May 2019) was a Mauritian squash player. He has represented Mauritius at the Commonwealth Games in 2014 and 2018.

References

1984 births
Mauritian male squash players
Squash players at the 2014 Commonwealth Games
Squash players at the 2018 Commonwealth Games
Commonwealth Games competitors for Mauritius
2019 deaths